Butler to the World: How Britain Became the Servant of Tycoons, Tax Dodgers, Kleptocrats and Criminals  is a 2022 book written by Oliver Bullough in which he argues the United Kingdom found a new role for itself following the 1956 Suez Crisis as agent and facilitator to the powerful and wealthy globally.

Reception 
The book was longlisted in 2022 for the Business Book of the Year Award by the Financial Times.

References 

2022 non-fiction books
Works about corruption
Profile Books books
St. Martin's Press books